Rob is a surname. Notable people with the surname include:

Chris Rob, American musician
Luboš Rob (born 1970), Czech ice hockey player
Luboš Rob (born 1995), Czech ice hockey player, son of Luboš

See also
Robb